Hassan Sheheryar Yasin, often referred to by his initials, HSY, (born 26 October 1976) is a Pakistani fashion designer and television host.

Born to a Arain family who were active in politics. His father, Mian Hamid Yasin, was a chief whip in Zulfikar Ali Bhutto government. His parents separated when he was in his early age. After separation, his mother moved to the United States. He received his early schooling in New York, USA. He was salutatorian of the Pakistan School of Fashion Design (class of 2000). Yasin is affiliated with the La Chambre Syndicale De La Couture Parisienne in France. He holds an honours degree in couture and serves on the board of directors and the executive committee of the fashion institute he graduated from. Hassan Shehryar hosts a prime-time talk show Tonite with HSY on Hum Sitaray.

Starting as a fashion choreographer in 1994, Yasin worked both as a choreographer and designer to various shows within Pakistan and international shows including Dubai, London, New York City and Toronto.

HSY
2000 marked the introduction of Yasin's own fashion label, HSY. Starting as a bridal and formal wear couture house, it became one of Pakistan's most recognized fashion labels and employs over 350 people and six stores internationally (including Dubai), with the flagship housed in Lahore. In 2003, Karachi-based Diva Magazine placed Yasin on the cover of their "Most Powerful People" issue and as one of their 10 "Faces of the Year".

In 2007, Yasin introduced a jewellery line under the HSY brand.

Filmography

Television

Films

References

External links
 HSY Biography and Work

Pakistani fashion designers
Living people
People from Lahore
Lux Style Award ceremonies directors
Pakistani television hosts
Punjabi people
1976 births